The Chobanids (Turkish: Çobanoğulları or Çobanoğulları Beyliği) were the ruling dynasty of the Anatolian beylik that controlled the city and region of Kastamonu in the 13th century.

History
The founder of the dynasty was Hüsamettin Çoban, a prominent Kayı statesman and a commander of the Sultans of Rum during the reigns of Kaykaus I and his successor Kayqubad I. In the early decades of the 13th century, Hüsamettin Çoban was one of the commanders of the raids that extended Seljuq territory in northern Anatolia at the expense of the Byzantine Empire of Trebizond. As a result, he had acquired Kastamonu as a fiefdom. Between 1224 and 1227, he also led the Seljuq army and fleet that set sail from Sinop and captured and fortified the city of Sudak in Crimea.

After Hüsamettin Çoban's death, his hereditary possessions centered in Kastamonu were ruled respectively by his son and grandson, Alp Yürek and Yavlak Arslan. Until the last years of Yavlak Arslan's reign, the Chobanid Beys pursued a prudent policy of allegiance to the Mongols who had established their hegemony over Anatolia following the Battle of Köse Dag. A rebellion in the end by Yavlak Arslan resulted in his death in battle before Kastamonu against combined Seljuq–Mongol forces, and the region was given to the Seljuq commander Shams al-Din Yaman Jandar, whose descendants were to found the Jandarid Principality in the same region.

Yaman Candar was momentarily pushed out of the region by Yavlak Arslan's son Çobanoğlu Mahmud Bey, who also organized further raids into Byzantine territory to extend his domain. But in 1309, this last Bey of Chobanids fell victim to an ambush by Yaman Candar's son Candaroğlu Süleyman Pasha and the region of Kastamonu passed to the Jandarids.

Chobanid dynasty left important works of architecture in and around Kastamonu. The Ottomans were vassals between 1281 and 1299 but declared independence after Yavlak Arslan stopped raiding the Byzantines in 1299.

List of rulers
Hüsamettin Çoban (from 1227)
Alp Yürek (d. 1280)
Muzaffer al-Din Yavlak Arslan (1280–1292)
Çobanoğlu Mahmud Bey (1292–1309)

See also
 List of Sunni Muslim dynasties

References

Further reading

External links

 
 

Anatolian beyliks
History of Kastamonu Province
States and territories established in 1211
Seljuk dynasty
History of Kastamonu
Sunni dynasties